Bellardia may refer to:
 Bellardia (fly), a genus of flies in the family Calliphoridae
 Bellardia, a monotypic genus of flowering plants in the family Orobanchaceae with the only species Bellardia trixago
 Bellardia, a genus of plants in the family Asteraceae; synonym of Microseris
 Bellardia, a genus of plants in the family Rubiaceae; synonym of Coccocypselum
 Bellardia, a genus of snails in the family Pachychilidae; synonym of Comarmondia